Hayden Kennedy (1990 – October 8, 2017) was an American rock climber and mountaineer who made difficult ascents in North America, Patagonia and in the Himalaya. He died by suicide in 2017 after the sudden death of his partner. He was the son of renowned writer and mountaineer Michael Kennedy and he won the Piolet d'Or for his ascent of The Ogre in 2013.

In 2012, Kennedy came to prominence following a "fair means" ascent of the Compressor Route on Cerro Torre during which he and his partner Jason Kruk chopped the bolt ladders left by Cesare Maestri on the first ascent. Kennedy and Kruk's actions created a local controversy in El Chaltén and they were arrested shortly after returning. Following their release from jail, their actions generated an ethics debate about bolting practices in the mountains in the international climbing community. The environmental and ethical motivations of their actions during this climb were recognized by the Piolet d'Or council. 

In 2013, Kennedy and his climbing partners Kyle Dempster and Josh Wharton won a Piolet d'Or for their alpine style first ascent of the south face of the Ogre.

Kennedy was a regular contributor for Alpinist, and for Rock & Ice magazines.

On October 7, 2017, while skiing on Imp Peak in Montana's Southern Madison Range, Kennedy and his partner Inge Perkins were caught in an avalanche. Surviving the avalanche, Kennedy attempted to rescue the buried Perkins but failed to locate her avalanche beacon. Later the following day, Kennedy committed suicide.

Notable ascents
 2008 - Onsight ascent of the Bachar-Yerian Route (5.11+, R/X), Tuolumne Meadows, Yosemite Valley, California
 2008 - Free ascent of El Nino (5.13b/c, A0), El Capitan, Yosemite Valley, California
 2012 - First 'fair means' ascent of the Compressor Route, Cerro Torre, Patagonia with Jason Kruk
 2012 - First free ascent of Carbondale Short Bus (5.14- R), the most difficult traditional rock climb in Indian Creek, Utah
 2012 - First ascent of South Face of Baintha Brakk (the Ogre), Karakoram Range, Pakistan with Josh Wharton and Kyle Dempster
 2012 - First ascent of East Face of K7, Karakoram Range, Pakistan with Kyle Dempster and Urban Novak
 2014 - First ascent of Light Before Wisdom (ED+ 5.11 WI6 M6 A2, 1200m), Cerro Kishtwar, Kishtwar Himalaya, India

References 

1990 births
2017 suicides
American mountain climbers
American rock climbers
Suicides in Montana
Piolet d'Or winners